The  is a wasabi farm established in 1915 and located in Azumino, Nagano Prefecture near the center of Honshū, the main island of Japan. It is a popular tourist spot due to its watermills and for the river that runs through it.

A restaurant offers wasabi-flavoured ice cream and other wasabi-themed products.

Outside Japan, the site is best known for its appearance in Akira Kurosawa's 1990 film Dreams during the film's final chapter, named "Village of the Watermills".

Daiō is one of Japan's largest wasabi farms — covering 15 hectares.

References

External links

 Daio Wasabi Farm 
 "Wasabi Farm" page in official travel guide of Azumino City "Explorer Azumino!"
  (including information on Daiō Wasabi Farm)

Farms in Japan
Watermills
Tourist attractions in Nagano Prefecture
Azumino, Nagano